The 1968 Surfers Paradise 6 Hour was an endurance race for sports cars and touring cars, staged at the Surfers Paradise International Raceway in Queensland, Australia on 1 September 1968.

The race was dominated by the Matich SR3 Repco V8 driven by Frank Matich and Glynn Scott, however an engine failure with just over an hour to run handed the victory to the Ferrari 250LM driven by brothers Leo and Ian Geoghegan.

Results

References

Motorsport at Surfers Paradise International Raceway
Surfers Paradise 6 Hour